Northwich Urban District is a former Urban District in Cheshire, based in the town of Northwich. It was created in 1894 and abolished in 1974 when it was incorporated into the Borough of Vale Royal, which was itself abolished in 2009..

See also 

 Northwich Rural District

References 

Districts of England created by the Local Government Act 1894
Districts of England abolished by the Local Government Act 1972
History of Cheshire
Urban districts of England
Former districts of Cheshire
Northwich